The Church of St Anne is in Aigburth Road, Aigburth, Liverpool, Merseyside, England.  It is recorded in the National Heritage List for England as a designated Grade II* listed building, and is an active Anglican parish church in the diocese of Liverpool, the archdeaconry of Liverpool and the deanery of Liverpool South Childwall.  Its architecture is an early example of the Norman Revival style.

History

The church was built in 1836–37 to a design by Cunningham & Holme.  It was founded by a group of local merchants, John Moss, Charles Stewart Parker, John Abraham Tinne and Josias Booker and was consecrated in 1837.  In 1853–54 broad transepts were added and the chancel was extended.  The north and south galleries were removed in 1893–94 and in 1913–14 the chancel was further extended.

The church was damaged in an arson attack by Suffragettes on 16 December 1913. The altar and choir stalls were burned during a period when this movement to obtain votes for women was increasingly militant.

Architecture

The church is built in ashlar stone with a slate roof in Norman Revival style.  Its plan consists of a west tower flanked by a baptistry to the north and a stair bay to the south, a four-bay nave, north and south transepts, and a three-bay chancel with the organ loft to the north and a vestry to the south.  The round-headed entrance is in the base of the tower with blind arcading and a diapered gable above it.  Over this is a clock face surrounded by a large rose motif.  The tower has paired two-light bell openings on each face over which is a cornice with corbels and a parapet with blind arcading.  The east window consists of three lancets and a rose window.  The west gallery is still present as are the galleries in the transepts.

External features
The gate piers are listed at Grade II.  There are two pairs of gate piers, which are made in stone, and are also Norman Revival in style.  They are octagonal, with features including arcading, corbels, and finials.

Community 
The church adjoins St Margaret's Church of England Academy and is used at times as the venue for carol and other services.

Images

See also

Grade II* listed buildings in Merseyside

References

Churches in Liverpool
Grade II* listed churches in Merseyside
Church of St Anne
Anglican Diocese of Liverpool
Church of England church buildings in Merseyside
Churches completed in 1854
19th-century Church of England church buildings
Romanesque Revival church buildings in England
1854 establishments in England